Muraenichthys malabonensis is a species of eel in the family Ophichthidae.

References

Muraneichthys
Fish described in 1923